Nermin Purić (born 15 May 1981) is a politician in Bosnia and Herzegovina. He served in the House of Representatives of Bosnia and Herzegovina from 2010 to 2014 as a member of the Democratic People's Union (Bosnian: Demokratska narodna zajednica, DNZ).

Early life
Purić was born in Ljubljana, Slovenia, then part of the Socialist Federal Republic of Yugoslavia. He was a journalist for the Public Company Radio Television Velika Kladuša from 2001 to 2004 and a spokesperson for the Democratic People's Union from 2004 to 2006. Purić is an economist; his parliamentary biography indicates that he taught at Banja Luka College until 2009, and his LinkedIn profile indicates that he holds a master's degree in International Business Management from the Carinthia University of Applied Sciences.

Parliamentary career
Purić was elected to the House of Representatives of the Federation of Bosnia and Herzegovina (one of the two entities that makes up the country Bosnia and Herzegovina) in the 2006 general election, taking the second of two seats won by the Democratic People's Union in the Federation's first electoral division. He served in this legislature for four years.

He was elected to the House of Representatives of Bosnia and Herzegovina in the 2010 general election, again winning a seat in the first electoral division of the Federation of Bosnia and Herzegovina. The only member of his party to win election to the legislature in 2010, he served in a mixed caucus that also included members of the Croatian Democratic Union 1990–Croatian Party of Rights alliance.

In October 2011, Purić was appointed to a legislative committee mandated to facilitate implementation of the European Court of Human Rights decision in the case of Sejdić and Finci v. Bosnia and Herzegovina.

The DNZ underwent a significant split in 2013, with several members joining the newly formed Labour Party of Bosnia and Herzegovina. Purić seems to have remained with the DNZ during this period. He was not a candidate in the 2014 general election. His LinkedIn profile indicates that he continued to work for the Bosnian parliament until 2015 and has since worked in management consulting in Austria.

Electoral record

References

External links
Nermin Purić (biographical entry), Parliamentary Assembly of Bosnia and Herzegovina

1981 births
Members of the House of Representatives (Bosnia and Herzegovina)
Living people
Politicians from Ljubljana
Democratic People's Union politicians